Godknows Murwira (born 4 July 1993) is a Zimbabwean footballer who plays as a midfielder for Platinum Stars F.C. and the Zimbabwe national football team.

International career

On 21 December 2021, Godknows was announced as a member of the Zimbabwe Team at the 2021 Africa Cup of Nations.

References

External links

1993 births
Living people
Dynamos F.C. players
Platinum Stars F.C. players
Zimbabwe Premier Soccer League players
Zimbabwean footballers
Zimbabwe international footballers
Association football midfielders
Sportspeople from Manicaland Province
2021 Africa Cup of Nations players